Hetty King was a British Music hall entertainer.

Hetty King may also refer to:
 Hetty King,  a character in the Canadian television series Road to Avonlea, played by the actress Jackie Burroughs
 Hetty King, spouse of James Green Martin